The 1968 SCCA Grand Prix Championship was the second annual running of the Sports Car Club of America's open wheel automobile racing series later to become known as the SCCA Continental Championship. The championship was open to SCCA Formula A, Formula B  and Formula C cars, with Formula A expanded to include vehicles powered by 5 liter production-based engines, with the Formula A category later being renamed to Formula 5000.

Race results
The 1968 SCCA Grand Prix Championship was contested over eight rounds.

Points system
Championship points were awarded to drivers on a 9-6-4-3-2-1 basis.

Championship results

References

External links
US Formula 5000 races 1968-1976, www.oldracingcars.com
Formula A/F5000 programs, www.myf5000.com

SCCA Grand Prix Championship
SCCA Continental Championship
Formula A (SCCA)
Formula 5000